Ann Van den Broeck (born 1976) is a Flemish actress and musical star. She ended her studies in 2000 at the Koninklijk Conservatorium of Brussels in the musical department.

After her studies she played in The Hired Man, A Little Night Music, She Loves Me, Marrily We Roll Along, Dracula de Musical, Peter Pan, Into the Woods, Edith en Simone and Beauty and the Beast. She is also known for various roles in Belgian and Dutch television shows.

In 2004, she won a Flemish musical prize for her role in Merrily We Roll Along.

Currently, she is playing Sanne (Cathy) in the Flemish version of The Last Five Years with Jan Schepens as Nathan (Jamie) in the Fakkeltheater in Antwerp.

On March 22, 2009, she will appear in the title role of Elisabeth in the first ever Belgian production of the internationally acclaimed musical.

Theater

Television 
 Happy Singles
 Provincieshow
 Samson en Gert
 Spoed
 Zone Stad
 Witse
 Aspe
 Lili en Marleen
 Twee straten verder
 Thuis
 Café Majestic
 Familie

Concerts 
 Maxemillecorde: Musical Strings (2004–2005)
 Maxemillecorde: Movie Strings (2005)
 Maxemillecorde: Musical Strings (2006)
 Nieuwjaarsproms 2007 (2007)
 Voices @ Hoegaarden (2007)
 Maxemillecorde: More Musical Strings (2007)
 Nieuwjaarsproms 2008 (2008)

Film 
 Any way the wind blows - dancer (2003)

Voice-over 
 Toy Story 2 - Jessie (1999)
 Scooby Doo 2: Monsters Unleashed - Velma (2004)
 Shrek 2 - Fairy Godmother (2004)
 Harry Potter and the Order of the Phoenix - walla (crowd, ghosts,...) (2007)
 The Golden Compass - Mrs. Coulter (2007)
 Enchanted - Giselle (2007)

Cast recordings 
 Flemish cast recording + DVD Dracula, de musical, 2005
 Flemish cast recording Beauty and the Beast, 2007

Awards and nominations 
 2004: Vlaamse Musicalprijs for Merrily We Roll Along - won
 2004: John Kraaijkamp Musical Awards for Merrily We Roll Along - nomination
 2006: Vlaamse Musicalprijs for Dracula - nomination
 2007: Vlaamse Musicalprijs for Edith en Simone - nomination

References

External links 
 
 Bakelietjes

Living people
1976 births
Place of birth missing (living people)
Flemish musical theatre actresses